Adriano Moraes may refer to:
 Adriano Moraes (bull rider)
 Adriano Moraes (fighter)